The 1979 Player's International Canadian Open was a tennis tournament played on outdoor hard courts at the National Tennis Centre in Toronto in Canada that was part of the 1979 Colgate-Palmolive Grand Prix and of the 1979 WTA Tour. The tournament was held from August 13 through August 19, 1979.

Finals

Men's singles
 Björn Borg defeated  John McEnroe 6–3, 6–3
 It was Borg's 9th singles title of the year and the 48th of his career.

Women's singles
 Laura DuPont defeated  Brigitte Cuypers 6–4, 6–7, 6–1
 It was DuPont's 1st title of the year and the 1st of her career.

Men's doubles
 Peter Fleming /  John McEnroe defeated  Heinz Günthardt /  Bob Hewitt 6–7, 7–6, 6–1
 It was Fleming's 10th title of the year and the 17th of his career. It was McEnroe's 17th title of the year and the 28th of his career.

Women's doubles
 Lea Antonoplis /  Diane Evers defeated  Chris O'Neil /  Mimmi Wikstedt 2–6, 6–1, 6–3
 It was Antonoplis' 1st title of the year and the 1st of her career. It was Evers' 1st title of the year and the 1st of her career.

See also
 Borg–McEnroe rivalry

References

External links
 
 ATP tournament profile
 WTA tournament profile

Player's Canadian Open
Player's Canadian Open
Player's Canadian Open
Canadian Open (tennis)